Postpartum care or postnatal care is a service provided to individuals in the postpartum period, to help with postpartum recuperation and restoration.

Traditional postpartum care 
Many traditional forms of postpartum confinement exist throughout the world. Chinese Zuo Yuezi (sitting the month) and European Lying-in are examples.

Korea 
Sanhujori is Korea's version of postpartum care. It draws on principles that emphasize activities and foods that keep the body warm, rest and relaxation to maximize the body's return to its normal state, maintaining cleanliness, eating nutritious foods, and peace of mind and heart. The confinement period is known as samchil-il (three seven days).

Modern commercial versions 
Traditionally, women were taken care of by their elders: their mother, mother-in-law, sister, or aunt. The lying-in hospitals provided an institutional variation which gave women weeks of bedrest and a respite from household chores. Increasingly, these older women are unavailable or unwilling to take on this role; given the lingering effects of the one-child policy, many older Chinese women had limited experience of newborn babies, having only had one themselves. Replacements for this familial help are commercial services, both in the home and at residential centres.

At home 
Agencies provide specialist carers that come to the new parents' home. This job used to be known as the monthly nurse, as she came and lived with the family for a month. Now more common terms are maternity nurse, newborn care specialist, or confinement nanny; the worker is not a registered health care professional such as the word "nurse" usually implies in current English. In Indian English the role is called a "japa maid".

A doula is best known as a birth companion, but some provide practical and emotional post-birth support. A lactation consultant and a health visitor are trained health professionals who may assist the new mother at this time. In the Netherlands, the in-home support is known as kraamzorg, and standard within the national health insurance system.

The use of yue sao, a specialist carer translated in Canada as "postpartum doula", is also very common in China. Yue sao typically are live-in domestic helpers who care for both the new mother and baby for the first month after birth. Salaries as at 2017 vary from RMB8000 to RMB20000 per month depending on city and experience. They are described as "mothering the mother". Australian documentary-maker Aela Callan called them "Chinese supermums" but says they are colloquially known as "confinement ladies".

Residential facilities 
Companies have sprung up to offer extended postpartum care outside the home, sometimes in a hotel-like environment. Luxury options are a business. Private postpartum care centres were introduced to Korea in 1996 under the name of sanhujoriwon. Within the Chinese tradition, specialist businesses such as Red Wall Confinement Centre charge up to $27,000 for one month. In Taiwan, postpartum nursing centres are popular, for those who can afford them.

Birth tourism centres operating under the radar in the United States for Chinese women offer "sitting the month".

See also 
 Parental leave
 Postpartum confinement
 Postpartum physiological changes
 Puerperal disorder

References 

Breastfeeding
Childbirth
Human development
Human pregnancy
Maternal health
Motherhood
Women's health
Health issues in pregnancy
Midwifery